Gmelina vitiensis is a species of plant in the family Lamiaceae. It is endemic to Fiji.

Rosawa (a common name) is a pale yellow brown colour, "teak like" timber with a fine texture and slightly interlocked grain. Rosawa is a very stable timber.

* Density: 640 kg/m3

* Durability: Durable

* Shrinkage: Low

* It is easy to saw and machine and the greasy nature of the timber enhances working properties.

Uses

* Boat building

* Planking interior and exterior cabin work

* Windows and doorframe sills

* Pattern making

* Carving

* Diving boards

* Decking

References

 http://whitecliffs.co.nz/timberspecies/rosawa/

Endemic flora of Fiji
vitiensis
Near threatened plants
Taxonomy articles created by Polbot